The Hawaii House of Representatives is the lower house of the Hawaii State Legislature. Pursuant to Article III, Section 3 of the Constitution of Hawaii, amended during the 1978 constitutional convention, the House of Representatives consists of 51 members representing an equal number of districts across the islands. It is led by the Speaker of the House elected from the membership of the House, with majority and minority leaders elected from their party's respective caucuses.  The current Speaker of the House is Scott Saiki.

Legislators are elected to two-year terms and are not subject to term limits.  As in many state legislatures in the United States, the Hawaii House of Representatives is a part-time body and legislators often have active careers outside government.  The upper house of the legislature is the Hawaii State Senate.

The last election took place on November 8, 2022.

Composition

Leadership

Members

See also
List of speakers of the Hawaii House of Representatives
Majority Leader of the Hawaii House of Representatives

Past composition of the House of Representatives

References

Resources
Hawaii State Legislature
Hawaii State Legislature Legislative Reference Bureau
Hawaii State House of Representatives
Hawaii State Senate

Hawaii Legislature
State lower houses in the United States